Yury Mukhin (born March 22, 1949, Dnipropetrovsk, Ukrainian SSR) — Soviet engineer, inventor and the top manager of the metallurgical industry; Russian public activist, researcher and writer. One of the most criminally prosecuted by the Russian authorities – since the beginning of the century he was the defendant in several dozens of lawsuits, accused and defendant in three criminal cases. In July 2015, Yury Mukhin and three other IGPR ZOV members were arrested and jailed in Moscow. In the resolution on initiation of criminal case of July 22, 2015
(on the basis of which Barabash, Mukhin, Parfenov and Sokolov were arrested)
it was specified that case against organizers of IGPR ZOV is brought for
creation of initiative groups for carrying out a referendum; holding of the referendum to update the Constitution of the Russian Federation with the articles on responsibility of the Supreme authorities to the people; propaganda of the idea of adoption of the law which allows people of Russia to assess the
activity of the President and members of the Federal Assembly. ("The repression of the initiators
of the referendum in the Russian Federation»).

Biography 
He graduated from Dnipropetrovsk Metallurgical Institute in 1973. In 1995–2009, Mukhin was editor in chief of the Russian newspaper Duel. Mukhin was the leader of the People's Will Army (Армия Воли Народа) - a private organization advocating for constitutional changes in the Constitution of the Russian federation and for the adoption of legislation establishing the direct responsibility of the President and of the Federal Assembly of Russia for their activities. Mukhin is the main proponent in Russia of the denial of the Soviet responsibility for the Katyn massacre. Mukhin is also a supporter of the "Putin must go" campaign and his website encourages other Russians to support the petition for Putin's, as well as current President Dmitry Medvedev's, resignation from power.

Views 
Mukhin claims that Nazism was also a response to Zionism, and that Zionists were responsible for the Holocaust:

Mukhin's writings have been described as antisemitic by the Russian "Agency for Jewish News" ("Агентство Еврейских Новостей").

In December 2008 the Zamoskvoretzky District Court of Moscow (Замоскворецкий районный суд Москвы) issued an order to shut down the  newspaper and on June 18 Mukhin himself was sentenced to a suspended prison term of two years for public calls for extremist activity. This happened one year after a previous attempt to shut down the newspaper failed, following an appeal in the Greater Moscow District Court.

In May 2009, Mukhin along with many other publicists, historians and human rights activists, welcomed the creation of the Historical Truth Commission.

He also supports Moon landing conspiracy theories and KAL 007 shootdown conspiracy theories.
He criticizes Marxism, Einstein's theory of relativity, genetics and advocates Stalinist era achievements of T. D. Lysenko.

References

Репрессии против инициаторов референдума в РФ

Russian conspiracy theorists
Russian non-fiction writers
Russian newspaper editors
1949 births
National Metallurgical Academy of Ukraine alumni
Living people
Russian inventors
Moon landing conspiracy theorists
Antisemitism in Russia
Russian Holocaust deniers